Chuck Berry Live in Concert is a live album by Chuck Berry. It was released in 1978, nine years after it was recorded at the 1969 Rock and Roll Revival concert at Varsity Stadium in Toronto, Canada.

Track listing
All tracks written by Chuck Berry except as noted:
 "Rock and Roll Music" – 2:29
 "Nadine" – 4:00
 "School Days" – 3:26
 "In the Wee Wee Hours (I Think of You)" – 5:20
 "Hoochie Coochie Man" (Willie Dixon) – 8:29
 "Medley: Johnny B. Goode/Carol/Promised Land" – 4:15
 "Sweet Little Sixteen" – 2:45
 "Memphis" – 4:11
 "Too Much Monkey Business" – 2:50
 "My Ding-a-Ling" (Dave Bartholomew) – 9:33
 "Reelin' and Rockin'" – 6:11
 "Johnny B. Goode" – 4:52
 "Maybellene" – 3:24

Personnel
 Chuck Berry – guitar, vocals
 Ron Marinelli	– guitar
 Hughie Leggat	– bass
 Danny Taylor – drums

References

Chuck Berry live albums
1978 live albums